FC Gold Pride was an American professional soccer club based in the San Francisco Bay Area, which participated in Women's Professional Soccer.  The club replaced the San Jose CyberRays of the defunct Women's United Soccer Association as the top-level women's soccer team in the San Francisco Bay Area.  FC Gold Pride moved to its final home of Pioneer Stadium on the campus of CSU East Bay in June 2010 after opening their 2010 home schedule at the Castro Valley High School Athletic Stadium. The club ceased operations in November 2010 after struggling financially and being unable to find new investors.

Team history

Founding 
FC Gold Pride was founded on 3 September 2008 as the seventh and final team to join the new top tier Women's Professional Soccer league.  The team is owned by a group led by Brian and Nancy NeSmith, the former being the CEO of Sunnyvale-based internet technology company Blue Coat Systems.  Former San Jose Clash midfielder and local youth coach Albertin Montoya was named the team's first head coach, while former CyberRays and Brazilian National Team player Sissi was announced as the first assistant coach for FC Gold Pride on 29 September 2008.

On 13 November 2008, the team's home venue was revealed to be Buck Shaw Stadium in Santa Clara, which it shares with San Jose Earthquakes of Major League Soccer as well as the Santa Clara University soccer teams.  The team revealed its official name and logo (FC Gold Pride) to the public for the first time on 19 November 2008.

On 16 September 2008, the initial WPS player allocation was conducted, which consisted of U.S. Women's National Team players.  Nicole Barnhart, Leslie Osborne and Rachel Buehler were allocated to FC Gold Pride.  On 24 September 2008, a further four players were allocated to the Bay Area via the 2008 WPS International Draft.  The allocated players were strikers Christine Sinclair (Canada) and Eriko Arakawa (Japan), along with two Brazilians, midfielder Formiga and defender Érika.  The Pride signed a one-year deal with Formiga in February 2009, as well as Arakawa, post-draft discovery pick Adriane (Brazil), Érika, and Sinclair.

At the 2009 WPS Draft, FC Gold Pride drafted three former college stars: UCLA midfielder Christina DiMartino, Notre Dame defender Carrie Dew, and Penn State forward Tiffany Weimer. Also amongst the 2009 draftees was former United States national team star Brandi Chastain.

2009 WPS season 

FC Gold Pride won their inaugural WPS game against the Boston Breakers on April 5, 2009. The club remained in strong contention until defender Kandace Wilson was injured during a home game against the Los Angeles Sol. After that, FC Gold Pride's second loss at the hands of the Washington Freedom marked the beginning of the club's slide to the bottom of the WPS rankings, where it would remain for the rest of the season. The club's transactions in the wake of Wilson's injury included signing Los Angeles Sol draftee Greer Barnes, elevating developmental player Marisa Abegg to the full roster, and returning Sissi to the field as a player.

In the end, FC Gold Pride failed to make the 2009 Women's Professional Soccer Playoffs, after a must-win game against the Saint Louis Athletica ended in a 1–1 draw. The club finally snapped its ten-game winless streak with a final 3–2 win against the Washington Freedom on August 1, 2009. However, a last loss to Sky Blue FC and a tie with Saint Louis Athletica did not allow FC Gold Pride to avoid finishing last in the WPS standings.

2009–2010 off-season moves 
The only player FC Gold Pride lost to the 2009 WPS Expansion Draft was defender Leigh Ann Robinson, chosen by the Atlanta Beat. Over the course of the offseason, the club traded Allison Whitworth to the Atlanta Beat, and released several players, including team captain Leslie Osborne, leading assist-getter Tiffany Weimer, Eriko Arakawa, Formiga, and Brandi Chastain. Osborne and Weimer would later join the Boston Breakers, and Formiga was taken by the Chicago Red Stars. The club signed Niki Cross (later to rejoin her first WPS club, Saint Louis Athletica), and Candace Chapman. After scouting the 2009 UEFA Women's Championship, the club signed Norwegian international Solveig Gulbrandsen.

In what was considered a major coup, FC Gold Pride signed Los Angeles Sol player Camille Abily, trading midfielder Christina DiMartino, FC Gold Pride's top 2009 WPS Draft pick, to Los Angeles. The club also had a successful 2010 WPS Draft, drafting 2009 Hermann Trophy winner Kelley O'Hara, New Zealand international Ali Riley, and 2008 U-20 World Cup champions Becky Edwards and Kaley Fountain, among others.

The Los Angeles Sol ceased operations not long afterwards; in the ensuing 2010 WPS Dispersal Draft, FC Gold Pride acquired Marta, Kiki Bosio, and Lindsay Browne. Another Los Angeles Sol player, Brittany Cameron, was also signed separately as a free agent.

2010 season 

FC Gold Pride started fast and kept its momentum running throughout the 2010 season. Despite the departure of Solveig Gulbrandsen and trading Kaley Fountain to the Atlanta Beat, the Pride dominated the league's regular season and on September 26, 2010, won their first WPS Championship by defeating the Philadelphia Independence, 4–0. Three members of the team garnered end of season honors: Marta was named Player of the Year and won the Golden Boot, both for the second consecutive season; Nicole Barnhart was named Goalkeeper of the Year; and Ali Riley was named Rookie of the Year. After the close of the 2010 season it was revealed on November 16, 2010 that FC Gold Pride had folded and would not be returning for the 2011 season.

Players

Final squad 
As of 12 August 2010.

Team captains
  Leslie Osborne (2009)
  Rachel Buehler (2009– )
  Camille Abily (2010– )

Final coaching staff 
As of January 2010.

Head coaches 
Information correct as of 11 August 2009.  Only competitive matches (regular season and playoffs) are counted.  Wins, draws, and losses are results at the final whistle; the results of penalty shootouts are not counted.

 General manager 
  Ilisa Kessler (1 November 2008 – 16 November 2010)

 Year-by-year 

 Team records 
 Games:  Kristen Graczyk, 20
 Goals:  Christine Sinclair, 6
 Assists:  Tiffany Weimer, 3
 Shutouts:  Nicole Barnhart, 2

 WPS awards 
 Michelle Akers Player of the Year Award
 Marta, 2010
 Goalkeeper of the Year
 Nicole Barnhart, 2010
 Rookie of the Year
 Ali Riley, 2010
 WPS Golden Boot
 Marta, 2010Winners'' (1): 2010

Home stadiums 
 Buck Shaw Stadium (2009)
 Pioneer Stadium (2010)

See also 

 Women's Professional Soccer
 National Women's Soccer League
 Women's United Soccer Association

References 

 
Association football clubs established in 2008
Defunct soccer clubs in California
Women's Professional Soccer teams
2008 establishments in California
2010 disestablishments in California
Soccer clubs in California
Soccer clubs in San Francisco
Soccer clubs in San Jose, California
Association football clubs disestablished in 2010